The Central Canadian Women's Football League (CCWFL) is a full-contact Canadian football league supported by Football Quebec and Football Ontario.

Originally founded in 2014, the league played its first season in 2022. It thus became the third cross-province league for women's football in Canada, alongside the Western Women's Canadian Football League and the Maritime Women's Football League.

In French, the league is named the Ligue centrale canadienne de football féminin (LCCFF).

History
The Central Canadian league was first formed in 2014, intending to play a 2015 season. Football Canada made the announcement in April 2014 of an over-18s' women's tackle football league. Its official launch in July was attended by the premier of Ontario, Kathleen Wynne, and members of the Toronto Argonauts gave continuing support to the players. Aaron Ellis had founded the project so that his daughter Tianna could continue to play football after high school. Teams would have been based in Mississauga, Hamilton, Scarborough and York Region. However, the planned league did not materialize in 2015 due to lack of registered players.

The Montreal Blitz had been established in 2001 and won the American Independent Women's Football League championship in 2012. The Ottawa Capital Rebels were founded in early 2020.

The Blitz and Rebels were co-founders of the CCWFL when it announced its re-formation in 2021. The Ottawa team's co-founder Sonia Rodi, a football coach and former rugby player, said, "When I go to these [coaching] clinics, I’m always the only female", and made an effort to find female coaches. She wanted the team to become a source of inspiration to girls who play football and are excluded: "It’s easier for men because it’s a sport for them. But for women, we just have to work harder for everything."

The league's first game was the Montreal Blitz versus the Quebec City Phoenix on May 14, 2022, at Stade Hébert, a 25–0 win for the Blitz, who were undefeated by the end of the season on June 25. The Montreal team is coached by former quarterback Saadia Ashraf. The Phoenix de Québec, from Quebec City, were newly founded in 2022. Ottawa played their 2022 home games at Matt Anthony Field, University of Ottawa. Because some team rosters were undersized, the 2022 games were played as 9-versus-9 players.

The CCWFL commissioner is Andréanne Dupont-Parent, the Montreal Blitz's general manager and a former player for Canada in the 2010 World Championship. Male CFL players who have been involved in training the CCWFL's players include Eddie Brown, Antoine Pruneau, and Samuel Thomassin.

A 2023 season has been announced by the league, which aims to expand to include teams in Toronto and Trois-Rivières, and elsewhere in Quebec and Ontario within five years.

In May 2022, ten CCWFL players were selected for the primary Canada team roster at the American football 2022 World Championship.

References

Canadian football
Canadian football leagues
Women's sports in Canada
Women's American football leagues
Canadian football leagues in Quebec
Sports leagues established in 2014